Artvin Province (Artvinis p’rovincia; Laz: ართვინიშ დობადონა Artviniş dobadona) is a province in Turkey, on the Black Sea coast in the northeastern corner of the country, on the border with Georgia.

The provincial capital is the city of Artvin.

Geography

Artvin is an attractive area of steep valleys carved by the Çoruh River system, surrounded by high mountains of Kaçkar, Karçal and Yalnızçam (up to 3900 m) and forest with much national parkland including the Karagöl-Sahara, which contains the Şavşat and Borçka lakes. The weather in Artvin is very wet and mild at the coast, and as a result is heavily forested. This greenery runs from the top all the way down to the Black Sea coast. The rain turns to snow at higher altitudes, and the peaks are very cold in winter.

The forests are home to brown bears and wolves. The Çoruh is now being dammed in 11 places for hydro-electric power, including the 249 m Deriner Dam and others at Borçka and Muratlı.In addition to the ethnic Turks, the province is home to communities of Laz people and Hemshin peoples. Autochthonous Muslim Georgians form the majority in parts of Artvin Province east of the Çoruh River. Immigrant groups of Georgian origins, found scattered in Turkey are known as Chveneburi. In particular, there is a prominent community of Chveneburi Georgians many of them descendants of Muslim families from Georgia who migrated during the struggles between the Ottoman Turks and Russia during the 19th century. With such diverse peoples, Artvin has a rich variety of folk song and dance (see Arifana and Kochari for examples of folk culture).

Local industries include bee-keeping especially in Macahel region.

Artvin is traversed by the northeasterly line of equal latitude and longitude.

Demographics

Places of interest
 The city of Artvin has an ancient castle and a number of Ottoman period houses, mosques, and fountains.
 Every June, there is a "bull-wrestling" festival in the high plateau of Kafkasör
 The Parekhi monastery, a Georgian monastery

Popular places for walking and outdoor expeditions.
 The Kaçkar Mountains are among the most-popular venues for trekking holidays in Turkey.
 Macahel Valley on the Georgian border, is another popular location for walking holidays.
 Papart forest in Şavşat
 Genciyan Hill in Şavşat, overlooks the border
 The lakes of Şavşat and Borçka and the crater lake of Kuyruklu.
 The Çoruh River is excellent for rafting and championships have been held here
 There are a number of Georgian churches in the valleys of Yusufeli. 
 Bilbilan Yaylası - a typical Turkish high meadow.
 Savangin pre-historical cave with an inscription written in an unknown or unsolved alphabet

Notable residents

 Zülfü Livaneli, singer and politician, born into a family from Yusufeli
 Kazım Koyuncu, folk rock singer, guitarist and composer, born in Artvin's Black Sea town of Hopa
 Şükriye Tutkun, folk singer 
 Mircan Kaia, singer, composer and engineer, born into a family from Borçka

Districts

In 1924, the Liva Sanjak was abolished and the Artvin Vilayet was created. Artvin Vilayet was combined with Rize to form Çoruh Vilayet with the capital at Rize. Later it was separated into Artvin Province with the districts of Ardanuç, Arhavi, Artvin, Borçka, Hopa, Murgul, Şavşat and Yusufeli.

Artvin province is divided into 9 districts (capital district in bold):
 Ardanuç
 Arhavi
 Artvin
 Borçka
 Hopa
 Kemalpaşa
 Murgul
 Şavşat
 Yusufeli

Sister cities
  Akhaltsikhe, Georgia
  Casablanca, Morocco
  Batumi, Georgia

See also
 Arifana
 Kochari
 Tayk
 Tao-Klarjeti
List of populated places in Artvin Province

References

External links

  the provincial governorate
  Artvin Weather Forecast Information
 Çoruh River Valley and future of artvin city
  Armenian History and Presence in Artvin
  Artvin has a Wikipedia all of its own including...
 photos of Artvin
 HQ pictures of Artvin
 more photos 
 World Wildlife Fund report on the area
  photos and villages of Artvin

 
Historical regions of Georgia (country)